Indirect presidential elections were held in Brazil on 25 October 1969. The elections were the third held under the Brazilian military government, and used an electoral college system.

Background
The National Congress had been closed since Institutional Act Number Five was issued on 13 December 1968. President Artur da Costa e Silva left office on 14 October due to ill health, later dying on 17 December. Vice-President Pedro Aleixo was not allowed to replace Costa e Silva, so the Chamber of Deputies and the Federal Senate were reopened to elect the a President and Vice-President, under the Instituctional Act 16.

The candidacies of General Emílio Garrastazu Médici and vice Augusto Rademaker were approved on the National Renewal Alliance Party's national convention on 16 October.

Results
Voting took place in the National Congress on 25 October. There were discourses from Oscar Passos from MDB, Filinto Muller from ARENA and Paulo Brossard from MDB.

References

Presidential elections in Brazil
Brazil
Presaident
Brazil